This is list of archives in Ecuador.

Archives in Ecuador 
 Archivo Histórico "Alfredo Pareja Diezcanseco" del Ministerio de Relaciones Exteriores de Ecuador
 Archivo Nacional República del Ecuador

See also 
 List of archives
 List of museums in Ecuador
 Culture of Ecuador

External links 
 General Archives (all)

 
Archives
Ecuador
Archives